Keratsa-Maria of Bulgaria (1348–1390) was Princess of Bulgaria during the Second Bulgarian Empire and Empress of Byzantine Empire. She was the daughter of Tsar Ivan Alexander of Bulgaria and his second wife, a converted Jew, Theodora.

Life
On 17 August 1355 Keratsa was betrothed to the future Emperor Andronikos IV Palaiologos. The marital document issued by the Patriarchate stated that "it would be beneficial to the Christians: Byzantines and Bulgarians, and pernicious to the infidels (the Turks)".

In 1373, while still co-emperor with his father, John V Palaiologos, Andronikos led a failed rebellion against the Ottoman Sultan Murad I. As a result, Keratsa (along with him and their son) were imprisoned for three years, until they were liberated by the Genoese. On 12 August 1376, Andronikos IV deposed his father and replaced him as Emperor of the Byzantine Empire, with Keratsa as his Empress consort. The new imperial couple remained in control of Constantinople until 1 July 1379, when John V was restored to his throne. Andronikos IV was declared co-emperor but conflict between father and son lasted until the death of the latter in 1385.

Keratsa spent the later part of her life as a nun under the name Mathissa. She died in 1390.

Children
Keratsa and Andronikos IV Palaiologos had three children, a son and two daughters. Their son became Emperor John VII Palaiologos, reigning for five months in 1390.

1348 births
1390 deaths
Bulgarian people of Jewish descent
Bulgarian princesses
Sratsimir dynasty
Palaiologos dynasty
14th-century Byzantine empresses
14th-century Bulgarian people
14th-century Byzantine people
14th-century Bulgarian women
Daughters of emperors
Mothers of Byzantine emperors